Cychropsis tuberculipennis is a species of ground beetle in the subfamily of Carabinae. It was described by Mandl in 1987.

References

tuberculipennis
Beetles described in 1987